John R. Cooke (1788  – 1854) was a nineteenth-century American politician from Virginia.

Early life
Cooke was born in Bermuda. In 1807, at age nineteen, he served as an officer in the Frederick militia that marched to the seaboard when the USS Chesapeake (1799) was fired upon by HMS Leaopard.

Career

As an adult, Cooke lived in Frederick County, Virginia and practiced law. He was elected as a member of the Virginia Assembly in 1814. 
 
Cooke was elected as a delegate to the Virginia Constitutional Convention of 1829-1830. He was elected by the convention to serve on the Committee on the Legislative Department, and he served on the Committee of Seven that drafted the Constitution of 1830. He was one of four delegates elected from the senatorial district made up his home district of Frederick, and Jefferson County.

Death
John R. Cooke died on December 10, 1854 in Richmond, Virginia.

References

Bibliography

Members of the Virginia General Assembly
1788 births
1854 deaths